Fight Dem Back, often abbreviated FDB, is a now defunct Australian and New Zealand anti-racist internet group. It concentrated its attention on the Australian & New Zealand white nationalist, fascist and neo-Nazi scenes. The group is named after a reggae song by Linton Kwesi Johnson .

Politics

The group was founded by a collective of internet activists from across Australia and New Zealand in late 2004. In Sydney, these people included the lawyer Mat Henderson, generally known as 'Darp', who prior to starting the group was mainly known as a prolific blogger, winning best NSW blog in the 2005 Australian blogging awards. In Melbourne, the organisation was headed up by Cam Smith, a multimedia producer and radio journalist. In Perth, Donald Oorst, a part-time academic and author helped build the group up. In New Zealand, the public faces of the group were Robert Trigan and well known community activist and anarchist Asher Goldman from Wellington. Trigan left FDB and New Zealand in July 2005 for New York 

By these criteria, Fight dem Back should be compared to the more moderate groups such as Searchlight, as it describes its operations as purely intelligence gathering and dissemination. However the split between moderate and radical anti-fascists does not seem to have happened in relation to the group. For example, they interviewed, with implied approval, two former members of the British Anti-Fascist Action , and there has been little or no criticism of the group from the left. They also ran an approving article marking the anniversary of the 'Battle of Cable Street' . Fight dem back officially espouse a non-sectarian platform. The group draws its membership from traditional left-leaning cliques but also directly from the various ethnic community groups who are affected by race-hate activism.

Membership policies

Compared to similar groups, FightDemBack gave a low priority to recruiting new members, and to 'screen' potential members more rigorously. A 2006 post on their discussion forum authored by Henderson  was "just a gentle reminder dear readers that being 'IN' FDB comes as a result of the senior and founding members voting you in", and stated that there were only thirteen members in Australia and New Zealand.

Activities

FDB conducted a number of disruption campaigns against allegedly racist organisations and their supporters. FDB's campaigns included attempts to reveal the identity of a person responsible for an anti-immigration campaign in Toowoomba, QLD; and general campaigning against the Australia First Party, the Patriotic Youth League and the New Zealand National Front. These campaigns resulted in a number of reprisals from radical organisations which have ranged from libel to vandalism and death threats. The group has since been disbanded.

See also
Anti-Defamation League
Anti-Fascist Action
One People's Project
Searchlight
Southern Poverty Law Center

References

External links
FightDemBack website

Organizations established in 2004
Anti-racism in Australia
Anti-racism in New Zealand
Anti-racist organizations in Oceania